Ballabhpur Wildlife Sanctuary (popular as Deer  Park) was established in 1977. This wooded area is located near Bolpur Santiniketan in Bolpur subdivision of Birbhum District in the Indian state of West Bengal.

Geography and location
This wildlife sanctuary is located in Bolpur Santiniketan.
With an area of 200 hectares, Ballavpur Wildlife Sanctuary located on the fringes of the University town of Bolpur is just the perfect getaway for your next weekend. Just a kilometer from the Viswa Bharati University area, this lush Wildlife Sanctuary is home to three large water bodies (Jheel) which hosts migratory as well as resident birds in plenty.

Climate

Fauna

This Wildlife Sanctuary is home to three large water bodies (Jheel) which hosts migratory as well as resident birds in plenty. The sanctuary was established in September 1967 and has one of the most successful deer conservation records in the state. It is home to numerous Cheethals (Spotted Deer), Blackbuck and other resident animals like jackals and foxes. The whole sanctuary is a protected area with watchtowers and jungle paths for tourists to walk around and catch glimpses of deer and other wildlife.

Timings
It is open from 10 am to 4 pm. It is closed on Wednesday.

References

 Wildlife sanctuaries in West Bengal
 Tourist attractions in Birbhum district
 Protected areas established in 1977
1977 establishments in West Bengal